James Printer, also known as Wowaus, (1640–1709) was a Native American from the Nipmuc tribe who studied and worked as a printer in Cambridge, Massachusetts. He was one of the most famous early Nipmuc writers. Printer was the first Native American printer's devil in America as well as one of John Eliot's most accomplished interpreters who assisted in the creation of the Eliot Indian Bible.

Early life
Little is known of Printer's early years. Printer was born in the Indian Praying town of Hassanamesit near what is now Grafton, Massachusetts. He was the son of Naoas. Naoas was a convert of John Eliot and a leading member of the Christian Native church in Hassanamesit.

Education
Printer attended Harvard's Indian College beginning in 1659. He worked as an apprentice to Samuel Green at his printing press. Through his apprenticeship he became an accomplished typesetter and he pursued a printing career for most of his life. He lived and worked among the English for nearly his entire life.

Printing career
Printer was the first Native American printer's devil in America. He played an instrumental role in the printing of John Eliot's Indian Bible, the first bible printed in America which was printed in the Massachusett language. Printer helped to complete a thousand copies of the Indian Bible before the end of 1663. While other Native Americans helped Eliot in the creation of his Bible, Printer is said to have been Eliot's most accomplished interpreter who did more than any of the other interpreters to translate the Bible into the Massachusett dialect. Several scholars point out the bible was most likely composed by Native Americans and that Printer along with Cockenoe and Job Nesuton deserve at least equal credit for the production of Eliot's collection of publication in Native American languages.

In addition to the Indian Bible, Printer helped to produce Indian Primers and two books of Psalms. He also typeset Puritan missionary works which publicized his and other Christian Native Americans' piety. Involved in the typesetting of the Cambridge editions of  Mary Rowlandson's famous captivity narrative, A Narrative of the Captivity and Restoration of Mrs. Mary Rowlandson, in which he appears as a minor character during Rowlandson's ransom negotiations.

Printer worked as a typesetter for sixteen years before the outbreak of King Philip's War.

King Philip's War
Printer's major contribution to American literature came during King Philip's War while he worked as a scribe for King Philip also known as Metacomet.

During the war, Printer left Cambridge for Hassanamesit. At the outbreak of King Philip's War, Printer was falsely accused of participating in the Lancaster raid, a raid on Lancaster, Massachusetts. He narrowly escaped death after an English mob accused him.  Following his escape, the town of Hassanamesit was attacked by Metacomet's men who gave the inhabitants the choice to either come with them or stay and have their corn stores burned. Printer along with the other inhabitants chose to go with Metacomet's men. During his willing captivity, it is believed, Printer along with other Native American Christian captives came to sympathize with Metacomet's men. During the war, Printer was known and despised by the English for being a traitor.

Printer is known for two letters he produced during King Philip's War. These letters were written from the Native Americans to the English.

The first of the two notable letters was found tacked to a bridge post outside of the town of Medfield, Massachusetts in 1675. While the note was unsigned, several scholars attribute the note to James Printer. The note states that the English have provoked the Native Americans to war and that the Native Americans have nothing to lose in the fight but their lives while English may lose their property and possessions. This letter is notable due to its shrewdness to recognize that the loss of the colonists' private property would make them vulnerable. In addition the fact that the message was written in English was evidence that it could only have come from a Native American with extensive Christian education  which showed the Englishmen's attempts to assimilate Native Americans was not wholly successful. Many have been puzzled by Printer's devaluation of Native American lives in the letter, but some scholars read it as an ironic appropriation of colonial logic, while others argue that is utilizes the English view of Native American lives as worth less than their own possessions.  It has also been suggested that it highlights the Puritan view that Native Americans were agents of God sent to deprive New Englanders of material property to remind them of their commitment to God.

The second letter is known to have been written by Printer during King Philip's War. This letter concerns the ransom for Mary Rowlandson, Mrs. John Kettell, and other colonists held captive by King Philip's men. This letter was part of the negotiation for the release of Rowlandson and her fellow captives. The letter can be read as an attempt by Printer to mend fences with the English. The letter is an extraordinary example of early Native American writing which shows Printers writing skills. Ironically he later worked as the typesetter for Mary Rowlandson's narrative of her captivity The Sovereignty and Goodness of God published in 1682.

After the war Printer was granted amnesty, but like the other Christian Native Americans he had to demonstrate his loyalty to the colonists. This demonstration likely involved bringing the heads or scalps of anti-English Native Americans with him on his return.

Later life
After King Philip's War, Printer returned to work as a printer in Cambridge. He later returned to Hassanamesit and taught there. He is described as working as a teacher for five Indian families in 1698. Following the war Printer advocated for Nipmuck land holdings. His son Ami signed the deed in 1727 which sold the last of the tribal lands at Hassanamesit.

References

1640 births
1709 deaths
American printers
People from Worcester County, Massachusetts
Native American people from Massachusetts
Native American history of Massachusetts
Translators of the Bible into indigenous languages of the Americas
17th-century translators